Friendship Creek is a  tributary of the South Branch Rancocas Creek in southern New Jersey in the United States.

Tributaries
Burrs Mill Brook

See also
List of rivers of New Jersey

References

Rivers of New Jersey
Tributaries of Rancocas Creek
Rivers of Burlington County, New Jersey